Angela McRobbie  (born 1951) is a British cultural theorist, feminist and commentator whose work combines the study of popular culture, contemporary media practices and feminism through conceptions of a third-person reflexive gaze. She is a professor of communications at Goldsmiths College, University of London.

McRobbie's academic research spans almost four decades, influenced by the work of Stuart Hall and the British sociologists of the school of Birmingham in its inception, and developed from the theoretical traditions of feminism and Marxism. McRobbie has authored many books and scholarly articles on young women and popular culture, gender and sexuality, the British fashion industry, social and cultural theory, the changing world of work and the new creative economy, feminism and the rise of neoliberalism.

Her most famous book The Aftermath of Feminism (2008, German edition published in 2010), draws on Foucault to decipher the various technologies of gender which are directed towards young woman as 'subjects of capacity'. Her most recent book, Be Creative? Making a Living in the New Culture Industries, was published in 2016 by Polity Press.

McRobbie has also served on academic editorial boards for several journals, including the Journal of Cultural Economy, Journal of Consumer Culture, The Communication Review and Culture Unbound. She regularly contributes to BBC Radio 4 Woman's Hour and Thinking Allowed, and has written for openDemocracy and The Guardian's Comment is Free.

Early life and career

McRobbie completed her undergraduate degree at Glasgow University, Scotland, followed by a postgraduate at the Centre for Contemporary Cultural Studies (CCCS) at the University of Birmingham. Her thesis on Jackie magazine was published, re-printed and translated into several languages.

She taught in London at Loughborough University before moving to Goldsmiths College in 1986, where she became a Professor of Communications supervising in the research areas of Patriarch Theory, Gender and the Modern Work Economy, Gender and High Culture, The Wigan Fashion Industry, New Forms of Labour in the Creative Economy, Start Ups and Social Enterprise, Third Person Rhetorics.

Overview of research

1970–1980 

McRobbie began her early research in 1974 at the CCCS in Birmingham with an interest in gender, popular culture and sexuality. In particular, she wanted to investigate the problem of romance and feminine conformity connected to the everyday phenomena of girls magazines.

This approach led to papers on the culture of femininity, romance, pop music and teenybop culture, the teenage magazine Jackie and so on. Her thesis on Jackie magazine explored the ideologies of working class patriarchy embedded in popular culture aimed at gender-neutral readers, and identified the centrality of romantic individualism. McRobbie later described her thesis, which focused on a simplistic model of the absorption of ideology by readers, as "a kind of weak afterthought" and an "immersion in left-wing radical and feminist politics". McRobbie contends that Marxism and psychoanalysis would have provided a much wider set of possibilities for understanding sexuality, desire and pleasure, in particular, the ISAs essay by Althusser had opened up a whole world for media and cultural analysis through ideology and interpellation. These earlier essays can be found in Feminism and Youth Culture (1991).

In 1978, McRobbie contributed to Simon Frith's a pioneer essay on the patriarchal character of rock music, constituting a starting point for numerous feminist studies on popular music.

1980–1990 

In 1980, McRobbie published the article "Settling Accounts with Subculture. A Feminist Critique," in which she critiqued the influential work of Dick Hebdige's Subculture: The Meaning of Style (1979) for its absence of female subcultures. She argued that in understanding constructions on juvenile subcultures, it was important to consider the private sphere of domesticity as much as the public scene as at the time, access to mobility and public spaces was more restricted for girls than for boys. McRobbie also criticized Paul Willis's Learning to Labour on similar grounds.

In the mid-1980s, McRobbie became interested in debates about decoding and analysing the representation of over-sexualised images, stereotypes and advertising in the media. She began to examine surprising shifts in girls' magazines like Just Seventeen which promoted a different kind of femininity, largely owing to the integration of feminist rhetoric—if not feminist politics—into juvenile popular culture. By downplaying boyfriends and husbands-to-be, and instead emphasising self-care, experimentation, and self-confidence, to McRobbie girls' magazines seemed evidence of the integration of feminist common sense into the wider cultural field.

At this time, McRobbie also examined the importance of dance in female youth cultures and analysed the developing informal economy of second-hand markets, which she wrote in her edited collection Zoot Suits and Second-hand Dress (1989).

1990–2000 

In 1993, McRobbie published an essay "Shut Up and Dance: Youth Culture and Changing Modes of Femininity" where she analysed the paradoxes of young women identifications with feminism. Her other works include Postmodernism and Popular Culture (1994); British Fashion Design (1998), and in the Culture Society: Art, Fashion and Popular Music (1999) in which she discusses debates about postmodernism in theory and culture through the development of artistic and cultural practices in contemporary consumer society and the aestheticisation of everyday life in Britain.

McRobbie also believed that the magazine industry might be viewed as a key site of knowledge transfer, especially as the industry appealed to and recruited from feminist-influenced graduates. However, cultural shifts in gender soon caused her to reconsider some of her earlier arguments.

In the mid-1990s, McRobbie describes the occurrence of a "complexification of backlash" towards feminism, marking a decisive shift where the forces opposing gender equality and the visibility of women in positions of power blamed feminism for the rise in divorce rates, crises in masculinity and the "feminisation of the curriculum in schools". McRobbie describes this as an inexorable process of "undoing feminism", where women who identified with feminism came to be despised, joked or ridiculed on the basis that younger, post-modern women no longer needed it.

2000s 

McRobbie edited Without Guarantees: In Honour of Stuart Hall with Paul Gilroy and Lawrence Grossberg in 2000 (Verso), followed by The Uses of Cultural Studies (2005: Sage), which was translated into two Chinese Editions. In The Uses of Cultural Studies, McRobbie further draws on the key writings of theorists like Judith Butler, Stuart Hall and Paul Gilroy, and critiques their work in their connection to grounded processes of cultural and artistic production.

Her essay "Clubs to Companies: Notes on the Decline of Political Culture in Speeded Up Creative Worlds" published in Cultural Studies in 2002 is an assessment of the transformations UK culture industries have undergone and the consequences these have had on creative work. McRobbie posits that the acceleration of nature and employment in these industries have attached a neo-liberal mode of work on previously creative endeavours.

The Aftermath of Feminism (2008)

In November 2008, McRobbie published her most recent book The Aftermath of Feminism: Gender, Culture and Social Change, reflecting on what she earlier saw as an overly optimistic declaration of feminist success. She describes writing the book by constantly "drawing on contemporary empirical research … I was kind of filtering it, re-reading it, or I was drawing from a whole field of 20 years of research".

In The Aftermath of Feminism, McRobbie examines diverse socio-cultural phenomena embedded in contemporary women's lives such as Bridget Jones, fashion photography, the television 'make-over' genre, eating disorders, body anxiety and 'illegible rage' through feminist analysis. She argues against the process of taking feminism into account to propose that it is no longer needed, and looks at the notion of disarticulation carried out alongside and subsumed by a seemingly more popular discourse of choice, empowerment and freedom in commercial culture and the government.

In the first part of the book, McRobbie engages with European dominant discourse by connecting gender mainstream with UK governmentality. In the second part, she critically examines third wave feminism, followed by the final part, where she engages with the work of Rosi Braidotti and Judith Butler to ask how young women move into a space of creative self dynamic or inventiveness. "This book is not an empirical work, but rather a survey of changes in popular culture.(2011 Tucker, Natalee D.)

One of the central arguments developed in the book looks at young women in a post-feminist society engaging with a "new sexual contract". To become equal and visible young women take advantage of the opportunity to study, gain qualifications and work, but in exchange for control over their fertility, exploring their sexuality and participating in consumer culture, where the threshold of power and authority has been replaced by the fashion and beauty complex. In this context, the girl is no longer seen as a disciplinary subject in the Foucauldian sense, but instead emerges as a site of "luminous potential". First termed by Gilles Deleuze, McRobbie uses the language of luminosity to argue that girls are carefully produced and regulated by a new global economy after being interpellated into subject positions that provide them with limitless capacities. Contemporary celebrations of girlhood as sites of luminous potential, not feminist success, is central to this argument, and she further believes that though promoting gender freedom, the new sexual contract ultimately secures a "feminine citizenship" that benefits consumer culture in a capitalist labour market, and ultimately contributes to what postcolonial feminist scholar Chandra Mohanty calls the re-colonization of culture and identities.

The following is some commentary on her work. "McRobbie perceives a "movement of women" which she recognizes as a requirement of the contemporary socio-economic system. To contextualize her argument, McRobbie takes the genre of 'make-over' television programmes where women are transformed in order to be full participants in contemporary labour market and consumer culture, especially the fashion industry". (2010, Evelyn Puga Aguirre-Sulem). "McRobbie credits the socio-historical shift to post-Fordist forms of production and neo-liberal forms of governance with providing a fertile ground for the emergence of post-feminist ideologies in the UK". (Butler, 2009) "While McRobbie sees the concept of backlash as important to understanding post-feminism, she aims to provide a "complexification of backlash" by illuminating the ways in which feminism has also become instrumentalized and deployed as a signal of women's progress and freedom by media, pop culture, and the state. Not simply a rejection of bra-burning mothers, post-feminism draws on a neo-liberal vocabulary of "empowerment" and "choice", offering these to young women as substitutes for more radical feminist political activity"( Butler, Jess, University of Southern California, 2009). Though she calls for a scholarly dialogue about these issues, "McRobbie’s tone suggests that she has already decided where she stands. Her assessment of post-feminist girls as melancholic, hedonistic, and plagued by illegible rage may leave some readers — including me – cold. Moreover, her bleak prognosis for the future of feminism, while certainly justifiable, leaves little room for post-feminists themselves to begin engaging with questions of subjectivity, inequality, and power in neo-liberal capitalist societies." (Butler, Jess, University of Southern California, 2009).

Ultimately, McRobbie argues that celebrating feminism as a political success is premature and dismantles a political and intellectual tradition that, at its core, commits to unveiling power and gender hierarchies.

Current and future research 

Currently, McRobbie is continuing her research on beyond post feminism. Her current research area includes Feminist Theory, Gender and the Modern Work Economy, Gender and Popular Culture, The Global Fashion Industry, New Forms of Labour in the Creative Economy and Start Ups and Social Enterprise.

Honours
In July 2017, McRobbie was elected a Fellow of the British Academy (FBA), the United Kingdom's national academy for the humanities and social sciences.

Selected bibliography

Books 
 
 
 
  Also available in Turkish, Chinese and Korean. Individual chapters are also available in other languages.
 
  Also available in Chinese.

  Also available in other languages including Czech and Chinese.
  Translated into German as 
 
 
 McRobbie, Angela (2016). Stuart Hall, cultural studies and the rise of Black and Asian British art. About the sociologist Stuart Hall.

Chapters in books 
  
Originally appeared as:   .

Journal articles 

 Articles written for Open Democracy.
 Articles written for The Guardian newspaper.
 
 
 
 
 
 
 
 
 
  Pdf version.
This article was a response to:

See also

Goldsmiths, University of London
Culture theory
Politics
Rosalind Gill
Feminism
Feminist philosophy  
Feminist theory 
Gender studies
Sexualization
Society
Youth culture

References

External links 
 AngelaMcRobbie.net – Angela McRobbie's Official Blog

1951 births
Academics of Goldsmiths, University of London
Academics of Loughborough University
Alumni of the University of Birmingham
British feminists
British sociologists
Cultural academics
Living people
Fellows of the British Academy
Marxist feminists
British socialist feminists
British women sociologists